The Sunday Show is the BBC's Sunday morning politics programme for Scotland, broadcast across television and radio platforms from the headquarters of BBC Scotland at Pacific Quay in Glasgow. The show airs weekly on BBC One Scotland and BBC Radio Scotland. It has run since February 2021 and is presented by Martin Geissler and Fiona Stalker.

History
The show replaced the Sunday Politics Scotland television show and the Sunday edition of Good Morning Scotland radio show. Gordon Brewer who presented Sunday Politics Scotland had announced his retirement in October 2020. The new show first aired on 7 February 2021.

Format
It is a cross-platform show that runs for two hours. The first half hour is broadcast on both television and radio, and the remaining 90 minutes on radio only. In summer 2021, the show was broadcast as a radio programme only.

References

External links
The Sunday Show on BBC website

2021 Scottish television series debuts
2021 establishments in Scotland
2020s Scottish television series
Sunday morning talk shows
BBC Scotland television shows
Politics of Scotland